Marina Aleksandrovna Zarzhitskaya (born 20 December 1981) is a Belarusian former artistic gymnast. She competed at the 2000 Summer Olympics.

References

1981 births
Living people
Belarusian female artistic gymnasts
Gymnasts at the 2000 Summer Olympics
Olympic gymnasts of Belarus
Place of birth missing (living people)
21st-century Belarusian women